This is a list of the best selling singles, albums and as according to IRMA. Further listings can be found here.

Top-selling singles
Pharrell Williams – "Happy"
 John Legend – "All of Me" 
 Hozier – "Take Me to Church"
 Band Aid 30 – "Do They Know It's Christmas?"
 Clean Bandit featuring Jess Glynne – "Rather Be"
 Ed Sheeran – "Thinking Out Loud"
 Pitbull featuring Kesha – "Timber"
 Meghan Trainor – "All About That Bass"
 Sam Smith – "Stay With Me" 
 Ella Henderson – "Ghost"

Top-selling albums*
Notes:
X – Ed Sheeran
Hozier – Hozier
In the Lonely Hour – Sam Smith
Four – One Direction
1989 – Taylor Swift
Halcyon Days – Ellie Goulding
In a Perfect World – Kodaline
No Sound Without Silence – The Script 
Ghost Stories - Coldplay
Tribal - Imelda May

Notes:
 *Compilation albums are not included.

References 

2014 in Irish music
2014